Slovenia, officially the Republic of Slovenia (Slovene: , abbr.: RS), is a country in Central Europe. It is bordered by Italy to the west, Austria to the north, Hungary to the northeast, Croatia to the southeast, and the Adriatic Sea to the southwest. Slovenes constitute over 80% of the country's population. Slovene, a South Slavic language, is the official language. Slovenia has a predominantly temperate continental climate, with the exception of the Slovene Littoral and the Julian Alps. A sub-mediterranean climate reaches to the northern extensions of the Dinaric Alps that traverse the country in a northwest–southeast direction. The Julian Alps in the northwest have an alpine climate. Toward the northeastern Pannonian Basin, a continental climate is more pronounced. Ljubljana, the capital and largest city of Slovenia, is geographically situated near the centre of the country.

Slovenia has historically been the crossroads of Slavic, Germanic, and Romance languages and cultures. Its territory has been part of many different states: the Roman Empire, the Byzantine Empire, the Carolingian Empire, the Holy Roman Empire, the Kingdom of Hungary, the Republic of Venice, the Illyrian Provinces of Napoleon's First French Empire, the Austrian Empire, and the Austro-Hungarian Empire. In October 1918, the Slovenes co-founded the State of Slovenes, Croats, and Serbs. In December 1918, they merged with the Kingdom of Serbia into the Kingdom of Yugoslavia. During World War II, Germany, Italy, and Hungary occupied and annexed Slovenia, with a tiny area transferred to the Independent State of Croatia, a newly declared Nazi puppet state. In 1945, it again became part of Yugoslavia. Post-war, Yugoslavia was allied with the Eastern Bloc, but after the Tito–Stalin split of 1948, it never subscribed to the Warsaw Pact, and in 1961 it became one of the founders of the Non-Aligned Movement. In June 1991, Slovenia became the first republic to split from Yugoslavia and become an independent sovereign state.

Slovenia is a developed country, with a high-income economy ranking highly in the Human Development Index. The Gini coefficient rates its income inequality among the lowest in the world. It is a member of the United Nations, the European Union, the Eurozone, the Schengen Area, the OSCE, the OECD, the Council of Europe, and NATO.

History

Prehistory to Slavic settlement

Prehistory 

Present-day Slovenia has been inhabited since prehistoric times. There is evidence of human habitation from around 250,000 years ago. A pierced cave bear bone, dating from 43100 ± 700 BP, found in 1995 in Divje Babe cave near Cerkno, is considered a kind of flute, and possibly the oldest musical instrument discovered in the world. In the 1920s and 1930s, artifacts belonging to the Cro-Magnon, such as pierced bones, bone points, and a needle were found by archaeologist Srečko Brodar in Potok Cave.

In 2002, remains of pile dwellings over 4,500 years old were discovered in the Ljubljana Marsh, now protected as a UNESCO World Heritage Site, along with the Ljubljana Marshes Wooden Wheel, the oldest wooden wheel in the world. It shows that wooden wheels appeared almost simultaneously in Mesopotamia and Europe. In the transition period between the Bronze Age to the Iron Age, the Urnfield culture flourished. Archaeological remains dating from the Hallstatt period have been found, particularly in southeastern Slovenia, among them a number of situlas in Novo Mesto, the "Town of Situlas".

Roman era 
The area that is present-day Slovenia was in Roman times shared between Venetia et Histria (region X of Roman Italia in the classification of Augustus) and the provinces Pannonia and Noricum. The Romans established posts at Emona (Ljubljana), Poetovio (Ptuj), and Celeia (Celje); and constructed trade and military roads that ran across Slovene territory from Italy to Pannonia. In the 5th and 6th centuries, the area was subject to invasions by the Huns and Germanic tribes during their incursions into Italy. A part of the inner state was protected with a defensive line of towers and walls called Claustra Alpium Iuliarum. A crucial battle between Theodosius I and Eugenius took place in the Vipava Valley in 394.

Slavic settlement 
The Slavic tribes migrated to the Alpine area after the westward departure of the Lombards (the last Germanic tribe) in 568, and under pressure from Avars established a Slavic settlement in the Eastern Alps. From 623 to 624 or possibly 626 onwards, King Samo united the Alpine and Western Slavs against the Avars and Germanic peoples and established what is referred to as Samo's Kingdom. After its disintegration following Samo's death in 658 or 659, the ancestors of the Slovenes located in present-day Carinthia formed the independent duchy of Carantania, and Carniola, later duchy Carniola. Other parts of present-day Slovenia were again ruled by Avars before Charlemagne's victory over them in 803.

Middle Ages 

The Carantanians, one of the ancestral groups of the modern Slovenes, particularly the Carinthian Slovenes, were the first Slavic people to accept Christianity. They were mostly Christianized by Irish missionaries, among them Modestus, known as the "Apostle of Carantanians". This process, together with the Christianization of the Bavarians, was later described in the memorandum known as the Conversio Bagoariorum et Carantanorum, which is thought to have overemphasized the role of the Church of Salzburg in the Christianization process over similar efforts of the Patriarchate of Aquileia.

In the mid-8th century, Carantania became a vassal duchy under the rule of the Bavarians, who began spreading Christianity. Three decades later, the Carantanians were incorporated, together with the Bavarians, into the Carolingian Empire. During the same period Carniola, too, came under the Franks, and was Christianised from Aquileia. Following the anti-Frankish rebellion of Liudewit at the beginning of the 9th century, the Franks removed the Carantanian princes, replacing them with their own border dukes. Consequently, the Frankish feudal system reached the Slovene territory.

After the victory of Emperor Otto I over the Magyars in 955, Slovene territory was divided into a number of border regions of the Holy Roman Empire. Carantania, being the most important, was elevated into the Duchy of Carinthia in 976.

By the 11th century, the Germanization of what is now Lower Austria, effectively isolated the Slovene-inhabited territory from the other western Slavs, speeding up the development of the Slavs of Carantania and of Carniola into an independent Carantanian/Carniolans/Slovene ethnic group. By the high Middle Ages, the historic provinces of Carniola, Styria, Carinthia, Gorizia, Trieste, and Istria developed from the border regions and were incorporated into the medieval Holy Roman Empire. The consolidation and formation of these historical lands took place in a long period between the 11th and 14th centuries, and were led by a number of important feudal families, such as the Dukes of Spanheim, the Counts of Gorizia, the Counts of Celje, and, finally, the House of Habsburg. In a parallel process, an intensive Germanization significantly diminished the extent of Slovene-speaking areas. By the 15th century, the Slovene ethnic territory was reduced to its present size.

In 1335, Henry of Gorizia, Duke of Carinthia, Landgrave of Carniola and Count of Tyrol died without a male heir, his daughter Margaret was able to keep the County of Tyrol, while the Wittelsbach emperor Louis IV passed Carinthia and Carniolan march to the Habsburg duke Albert II of Austria, whose mother, Elisabeth of Carinthia is a sister of the late duke Henry of Gorizia. Therefore, most of the territory of present-day Slovenia became a hereditary land of the Habsburg monarchy. As with the other component parts of the Habsburg monarchy, Carinthia and Carniola remained a semi-autonomous state with its own constitutional structure for a long time. The counts of Celje, a feudal family from this area who in 1436 acquired the title of state princes, were Habsburgs' powerful competitors for some time. This large dynasty, important at a European political level, had its seat in Slovene territory but died out in 1456. Its numerous large estates subsequently became the property of the Habsburgs, who retained control of the area right up until the beginning of the 20th century. Patria del Friuli ruled present western Slovenia until Venetian takeover in 1420.

At the end of the Middle Ages, the Slovene Lands suffered a serious economic and demographic setback because of the Turkish raids. In 1515, a peasant revolt spread across nearly the whole Slovene territory. In 1572 and 1573 the Croatian-Slovenian peasant revolt wrought havoc throughout the wider region. Such uprisings, which often met with bloody defeats, continued throughout the 17th century.

Early modern period 
After the dissolution of the Republic of Venice in 1797, the Venetian Slovenia was passed to the Austrian Empire. The Slovene Lands were part of the French-administered Illyrian provinces established by Napoleon, the Austrian Empire and Austria-Hungary. Slovenes inhabited most of Carniola, the southern part of the duchies of Carinthia and Styria, the northern and eastern areas of the Austrian Littoral, as well as Prekmurje in the Kingdom of Hungary. Industrialization was accompanied by construction of railroads to link cities and markets, but the urbanization was limited.

Due to limited opportunities, between 1880 and 1910 there was extensive emigration, and around 300,000 Slovenes (i.e. 1 in 6) emigrated to other countries, mostly to the US, but also to South America (the main part to Argentina), Germany, Egypt, and to larger cities in Austria-Hungary, especially Vienna and Graz. The area of the United States with the highest concentration of Slovenian immigrants is Cleveland, Ohio. The other locations in the United States where many Slovenians settled were areas with substantial industrial and mining activities: Pittsburgh, Chicago, Pueblo, Butte, northern Minnesota, and the Salt Lake Valley. The men were important as workers in the mining industry, because of some of the skills they brought from Slovenia. Despite this emigration, the population of Slovenia increased significantly. Literacy was exceptionally high, at 80–90%.

The 19th century also saw a revival of culture in Slovene, accompanied by a Romantic nationalist quest for cultural and political autonomy. The idea of a United Slovenia, first advanced during the revolutions of 1848, became the common platform of most Slovenian parties and political movements in Austria-Hungary. During the same period, Yugoslavism, an ideology stressing the unity of all South Slavic peoples, spread as a reaction to Pan-German nationalism and Italian irredentism.

World War I 

World War I brought heavy casualties to Slovenes, particularly the twelve Battles of the Isonzo, which took place in present-day Slovenia's western border area with Italy. Hundreds of thousands of Slovene conscripts were drafted into the Austro-Hungarian Army, and over 30,000 of them died. Hundreds of thousands of Slovenes from Princely County of Gorizia and Gradisca were resettled in refugee camps in Italy and Austria. While the refugees in Austria received decent treatment, the Slovene refugees in Italian camps were treated as state enemies, and several thousand died of malnutrition and diseases between 1915 and 1918. Entire areas of the Slovene Littoral were destroyed.

The Treaty of Rapallo of 1920 left approximately 327,000 out of the total population of 1.3 million Slovenes in Italy. After the fascists took power in Italy, they were subjected to a policy of violent Fascist Italianization. This caused the mass emigration of Slovenes, especially the middle class, from the Slovene Littoral and Trieste to Yugoslavia and South America. Those who remained organized several connected networks of both passive and armed resistance. The best known was the militant anti-fascist organization TIGR, formed in 1927 to fight Fascist oppression of the Slovene and Croat populations in the Julian March.

Kingdom of Serbs, Croats, and Slovenes (later the Kingdom of Yugoslavia) 

The Slovene People's Party launched a movement for self-determination, demanding the creation of a semi-independent South Slavic state under Habsburg rule. The proposal was picked up by most Slovene parties, and a mass mobilization of Slovene civil society, known as the Declaration Movement, followed. This demand was rejected by the Austrian political elites; but following the dissolution of the Austro-Hungarian Empire in the aftermath of the First World War, the National Council of Slovenes, Croats and Serbs took power in Zagreb on 6 October 1918. On 29 October, independence was declared by a national gathering in Ljubljana, and by the Croatian parliament, declaring the establishment of the new State of Slovenes, Croats, and Serbs.

On 1 December 1918, the State of Slovenes, Croats and Serbs merged with Serbia, becoming part of the new Kingdom of Serbs, Croats, and Slovenes; in 1929 it was renamed the Kingdom of Yugoslavia. The main territory of Slovenia, being the most industrialized and westernized compared to other less developed parts of Yugoslavia, became the main centre of industrial production: Compared to Serbia, for example, Slovenian industrial production was four times greater; and it was 22 times greater than in North Macedonia. The interwar period brought further industrialization in Slovenia, with rapid economic growth in the 1920s, followed by a relatively successful economic adjustment to the 1929 economic crisis and Great Depression.

Following a plebiscite in October 1920, the Slovene-speaking southern Carinthia was ceded to Austria. With the Treaty of Trianon, on the other hand, the Kingdom of Yugoslavia was awarded the Slovene-inhabited Prekmurje region, formerly part of Austria-Hungary. Slovenes living in territories that fell under the rule of the neighboring states—Italy, Austria, and Hungary—were subjected to assimilation.

World War II 

Slovenia was the only present-day European nation that was trisected and completely annexed into both Nazi Germany and Fascist Italy during World War II. In addition, the Prekmurje region in the east was annexed to Hungary, and some villages in the Lower Sava Valley were incorporated in the newly created Nazi puppet Independent State of Croatia (NDH). Axis forces invaded Yugoslavia in April 1941 and defeated the country in a few weeks. The southern part, including Ljubljana, was annexed to Italy, while the Nazis took over the northern and eastern parts of the country. The Nazis had a plan of ethnic cleansing of these areas, and they resettled or expelled the local Slovene civilian population to the puppet states of Nedić's Serbia (7,500) and NDH (10,000). In addition, some 46,000 Slovenes were expelled to Germany, including children who were separated from their parents and allocated to German families. At the same time, the ethnic Germans in the Gottschee enclave in the Italian annexation zone were resettled to the Nazi-controlled areas cleansed of their Slovene population.
Around 30,000 to 40,000 Slovene men were drafted to the German Army and sent to the Eastern front. Slovene was banned from education, and its use in public life was limited to the absolute minimum.

In south-central Slovenia, annexed by Fascist Italy and renamed the Province of Ljubljana, the Slovenian National Liberation Front was organized in April 1941. Led by the Communist Party, it formed the Slovene Partisan units as part of the Yugoslav Partisans led by the Communist leader Josip Broz Tito.

After the resistance started in summer 1941, Italian violence against the Slovene civilian population escalated, as well. The Italian authorities deported some 25,000 people to the concentration camps, which equaled 7.5% of the population of their occupation zone. The most infamous ones were Rab and Gonars. To counter the Communist-led insurgence, the Italians sponsored local anti-guerrilla units, formed mostly by the local conservative Catholic Slovene population that resented the revolutionary violence of the partisans. After the Italian armistice of September 1943, the Germans took over both the Province of Ljubljana and the Slovenian Littoral, incorporating them into what was known as the Operation Zone of Adriatic Coastal Region. They united the Slovene anti-Communist counter-insurgence into the Slovene Home Guard and appointed a puppet regime in the Province of Ljubljana. The anti-Nazi resistance however expanded, creating its own administrative structures as the basis for Slovene statehood within a new, federal and socialist Yugoslavia.

In 1945, Yugoslavia was liberated by the partisan resistance and soon became a socialist federation known as the People's Federal Republic of Yugoslavia. The first Slovenian republic, named Federal Slovenia, was a constituent republic of the Yugoslavian federation, led by its own pro-Communist leadership.

Approximately 8% of the entire Slovene population died during World War II. The small Jewish community, mostly settled in the Prekmurje region, perished in 1944 in the holocaust of Hungarian Jews. The German speaking minority, amounting to 2.5% of the Slovenian population prior to WWII, was either expelled or killed in the aftermath of the war. Hundreds of Istrian Italians and Slovenes that opposed communism were killed in the foibe massacres, and more than 25,000 fled or were expelled from Slovenian Istria in the aftermath of the war. Around 130 000 persons, mostly political and military opponents, were executed after the end of the Second World War in May and June 1945.

Socialist period 

During the re-establishment of Yugoslavia in World War II, the first Slovenian republic, Federal Slovenia, was created and it became part of Federal Yugoslavia. It was a socialist state, but because of the Tito–Stalin split in 1948, economic and personal freedoms were much broader than in the Eastern Bloc countries. In 1947, the Slovene Littoral and the western half of Inner Carniola, which had been annexed by Italy after World War One, were annexed to Slovenia. 

After the failure of forced collectivisation that was attempted from 1949 to 1953, a policy of gradual economic liberalisation, known as workers self-management, was introduced under the advice and supervision of the Slovene Marxist theoretician and Communist leader Edvard Kardelj, the main ideologue of the Titoist path to socialism. Suspected opponents of this policy both from within and outside the Communist party were persecuted and thousands were sent to Goli otok.

The late 1950s saw a policy of liberalization in the cultural sphere as well, and unlimited border crossing into western countries was allowed, both for Yugoslav citizens and for foreigners. In 1956, Josip Broz Tito, together with other leaders, founded the Non-Aligned Movement. Particularly in the 1950s, Slovenia's economy developed rapidly and was strongly industrialized. With further economic decentralization of Yugoslavia in 1965–66, Slovenia's domestic product was 2.5 times the average of Yugoslav republics. While being a Communist country, after the Tito–Stalin split Yugoslavia initiated a period of military neutrality and non-alignment. JAT Yugoslav Airlines was the flag carrier and during its existence it grew to become one of the leading airlines in Europe both by fleet and destinations, its fleet included most of the Western-built aircraft, and destinations included five continents. By the 1970s more airlines were created including Slovenian Adria Airways mostly focused in the growing tourist industry. Until the 1980s, Slovenia enjoyed relatively broad autonomy within the federation. It was the most liberal communist state in Europe, the passport of Yugoslavia Federation allowed Yugoslavians to travel to most world countries of any socialist country during the Cold War. Many people worked in western countries, which reduced unemployment in their home country.

Opposition to the regime was mostly limited to intellectual and literary circles and became especially vocal after Tito's death in 1980 when the economic and political situation in Yugoslavia became very strained. Political disputes around economic measures were echoed in the public sentiment, as many Slovenians felt they were being economically exploited, having to sustain an expensive and inefficient federal administration.

Slovenian Spring, democracy and independence 
In 1987 a group of intellectuals demanded Slovene independence in the 57th edition of the magazine Nova revija. Demands for democratisation and more Slovenian independence were sparked off. A mass democratic movement, coordinated by the Committee for the Defence of Human Rights, pushed the Communists in the direction of democratic reforms.

In September 1989, numerous constitutional amendments were passed to introduce parliamentary democracy to Slovenia.  On 7 March 1990, the Slovenian Assembly changed the official name of the state to the "Republic of Slovenia". In April 1990, the first democratic election in Slovenia took place, and the united opposition movement DEMOS led by Jože Pučnik emerged victorious.

The initial revolutionary events in Slovenia pre-dated the Revolutions of 1989 in Eastern Europe by almost a year, but went largely unnoticed by international observers. On 23 December 1990, more than 88% of the electorate voted for a sovereign and independent Slovenia. On 25 June 1991, Slovenia became independent through the passage of appropriate legal documents. On 27 June in the early morning, the Yugoslav People's Army dispatched its forces to prevent further measures for the establishment of a new country, which led to the Ten-Day War. On 7 July, the Brijuni Agreement was signed, implementing a truce and a three-month halt of the enforcement of Slovenia's independence. At the end of the month, the last soldiers of the Yugoslav Army left Slovenia.

In December 1991, a new constitution was adopted, followed in 1992 by the laws on denationalisation and privatization. The members of the European Union recognised Slovenia as an independent state on 15 January 1992, and the United Nations accepted it as a member on 22 May 1992.

Slovenia joined the European Union on 1 May 2004. Slovenia has one Commissioner in the European Commission, and seven Slovene parliamentarians were elected to the European Parliament at elections on 13 June 2004. In 2004 Slovenia also joined NATO. Slovenia subsequently succeeded in meeting the Maastricht criteria and joined the Eurozone (the first transition country to do so) on 1 January 2007. It was the first post-Communist country to hold the Presidency of the Council of the European Union, for the first six months of 2008. On 21 July 2010, it became a member of the OECD.

The disillusionment with domestic socio-economic elites at municipal and national levels was expressed at the 2012–2013 Slovenian protests on a wider scale than in the smaller 15 October 2011 protests. In relation to the leading politicians' response to allegations made by the official Commission for the Prevention of Corruption of the Republic of Slovenia, legal experts expressed the need for changes in the system that would limit political arbitrariness.

Geography 

Slovenia is situated in Central Europe touching the Alps and bordering the Mediterranean Sea. At the regional conference in Prague in 1994, the International Geographical Union ranked Slovenia among the nine Central European countries, including Germany, Poland, the Czech Republic, Slovakia, Hungary, Switzerland, Liechtenstein and Austria. It lies between latitudes 45° and 47° N, and longitudes 13° and 17° E. The 15th meridian east almost corresponds to the middle line of the country in the direction west–east. The Geometric Centre of the Republic of Slovenia is located at coordinates 46°07'11.8" N and 14°48'55.2" E. It lies in Slivna in the Municipality of Litija.

Four major European geographic regions meet in Slovenia: the Alps, the Dinarides, the Pannonian Plain, and the Mediterranean Sea. Although on the shore of the Adriatic Sea near the Mediterranean Sea, most of Slovenia is in the Black Sea drainage basin. The Alps—including the Julian Alps, the Kamnik-Savinja Alps and the Karawank chain, as well as the Pohorje massif—dominate Northern Slovenia along its long border with Austria.

The term "Karst topography" refers to that of southwestern Slovenia's Karst Plateau, a limestone region of underground rivers, gorges, and caves, between Ljubljana and the Mediterranean Sea. On the Pannonian plain to the East and Northeast, toward the Croatian and Hungarian borders, the landscape is essentially flat. However, most of Slovenia is hilly or mountainous, with around 90% of its land surface  or more above sea level.

The areas are covered mostly by beech, fir-beech and beech-oak forests and have a relatively high production capacity. Remnants of primeval forests are still to be found, the largest in the Kočevje area.

Geology 

Slovenia is in a rather active seismic zone because of its position on the small Adriatic Plate, which is squeezed between the Eurasian Plate to the north and the African Plate to the south and rotates counter-clockwise. Thus the country is at the junction of three important geotectonic units: the Alps to the north, the Dinaric Alps to the south and the Pannonian Basin to the east. Scientists have been able to identify 60 destructive earthquakes in the past. Additionally, a network of seismic stations is active throughout the country.

Many parts of Slovenia have a carbonate bedrock and extensive cave systems have developed.

Natural regions 
The first regionalisations of Slovenia were made by geographers Anton Melik (1935–1936) and Svetozar Ilešič (1968). The newer regionalisation by Ivan Gams divided Slovenia in the following macroregions:

 the Alps (Alpe)
 the subalpine landscapes (predalpski svet)
 the Slovene Littoral or Submediterranean Slovenia (Primorje or submediteranska Slovenija)
 the Dinaric plateaus of the continental Slovenia (dinarske planote celinske Slovenije)
 Subpannonian Slovenia (subpanonska Slovenija)

According to a newer natural geographic regionalisation, the country consists of four macroregions. These are the Alpine, the Mediterranean, the Dinaric, and the Pannonian landscapes. Macroregions are defined according to major relief units (the Alps, the Pannonian plain, the Dinaric mountains) and climate types (submediterranean, temperate continental, mountain climate). These are often quite interwoven.

Protected areas of Slovenia include national parks, regional parks, and nature parks, the largest of which is Triglav National Park. There are 286 Natura 2000 designated protected areas, which include 36% of the country's land area, the largest percentage among European Union states. Additionally, according to Yale University's Environmental Performance Index, Slovenia is considered a "strong performer" in environmental protection efforts.

Climate 

Slovenia is located in temperate latitudes. The climate is also influenced by the variety of relief, and the influence of the Alps and the Adriatic Sea. In the northeast, the continental climate type with greatest difference between winter and summer temperatures prevails. In the coastal region, there is sub-Mediterranean climate. The effect of the sea on the temperature rates is also visible up the Soča Valley, while a severe Alpine climate is present in the high mountain regions. There is a strong interaction between these three climatic systems across most of the country.

Compared to Western Europe, Slovenia is not very windy, because it lies in the slipstream of the Alps. The average wind speeds are lower than in the plains of the nearby countries. Due to the rugged terrain, local vertical winds with daily periods are present. Besides these, there are three winds of particular regional importance: the bora, the jugo, and the foehn. The jugo and the bora are characteristic of the Littoral. Whereas the jugo is humid and warm, the bora is usually cold and gusty. The foehn is typical of the Alpine regions in the north of Slovenia. Generally present in Slovenia are the northeast wind, the southeast wind and the north wind.

Waters 

The territory of Slovenia mainly (i.e. 81%) belongs to the Black Sea basin, and a smaller part (i.e. 19%) belongs to the Adriatic Sea basin. These two parts are divided into smaller units in regard to their central rivers, the Mura River basin, the Drava River basin, the Sava River basin with Kolpa River basin, and the basin of the Adriatic rivers. In comparison with other developed countries, water quality in Slovenia is considered to be among the highest in Europe. One of the reasons is undoubtedly that most of the rivers rise on the mountainous territory of Slovenia. However, this does not mean that Slovenia has no problems with surface water and groundwater quality, especially in areas with intensive farming.

Biodiversity 

Slovenia signed the Rio Convention on Biological Diversity on 13 June 1992 and became a party to the convention on 9 July 1996. It subsequently produced a National Biodiversity Strategy and Action Plan, which was received by the convention on 30 May 2002.

Slovenia is distinguished by an exceptionally wide variety of habitats, due to the contact of geological units and biogeographical regions, and due to human influences. The country is home to four terrestrial ecoregions: Dinaric Mountains mixed forests, Pannonian mixed forests, Alps conifer and mixed forests, and Illyrian deciduous forests. Around 12.5% of the territory is protected with 35.5% in the Natura 2000 ecological network. Despite this, because of pollution and environmental degradation, diversity has been in decline. Slovenia had a 2019 Forest Landscape Integrity Index mean score of 3.78/10, ranking it 140th globally out of 172 countries.

Animals
The biological diversity of the country is high, with 1% of the world's organisms on 0.004% of the Earth's surface area. There are 75 mammal species, among them marmots, Alpine ibex, and chamois. There are numerous deer, roe deer, boar, and hares. The edible dormouse is often found in the Slovenian beech forests. Trapping these animals is a long tradition and is a part of the Slovenian national identity.

Some important carnivores include the Eurasian lynx, European wild cats, foxes (especially the red fox), and European jackal. There are hedgehogs, martens, and snakes such as vipers and grass snakes. According to recent estimates, Slovenia has c. 40–60 wolves and about 450 brown bears.

Slovenia is home to an exceptionally diverse number of cave species, with a few tens of endemic species. Among the cave vertebrates, the only known one is the olm, living in Karst, Lower Carniola, and White Carniola.

The only regular species of cetaceans found in the northern Adriatic sea is the bottlenose dolphin (Tursiops truncatus).

There are a wide variety of birds, such as the tawny owl, the long-eared owl, the eagle owl, hawks, and short-toed eagles. Other birds of prey have been recorded, as well as a growing number of ravens, crows and magpies migrating into Ljubljana and Maribor where they thrive. Other birds include black and green woodpeckers and the white stork, which nests mainly in Prekmurje.

There are 13 domestic animals native to Slovenia, of eight species (hen, pig, dog, horse, sheep, goat, honey bee, and cattle). Among these are the Karst Shepherd, the Carniolan honeybee, and the Lipizzan horse. They have been preserved ex situ and in situ. The marble trout or marmorata (Salmo marmoratus) is an indigenous Slovenian fish. Extensive breeding programmes have been introduced to repopulate the marble trout into lakes and streams invaded by non-indigenous species of trout. Slovenia is also home to the wels catfish.

Fungi
More than 2,400 fungal species have been recorded from Slovenia and, since that figure does not include lichen-forming fungi, the total number of Slovenian fungi already known is undoubtedly much higher. Many more remain to be discovered.

Plants
Slovenia is the third most-forested country in Europe, with 58.3% of the territory covered by forests. The forests are an important natural resource, and logging is kept to a minimum. In the interior of the country are typical Central European forests, predominantly oak and beech. In the mountains, spruce, fir, and pine are more common. Pine trees grow on the Karst Plateau, although only one-third of the region is covered by pine forest. The lime/linden tree, common in Slovenian forests, is a national symbol.

In the Alps, flowers such as Daphne blagayana, gentians (Gentiana clusii, Gentiana froelichii), Primula auricula, edelweiss (the symbol of Slovene mountaineering), Cypripedium calceolus, Fritillaria meleagris (snake's head fritillary), and Pulsatilla grandis are found.

Slovenia harbors many plants of ethnobotanically useful groups. Of 59 known species of ethnobotanical importance, some species such as Aconitum napellus, Cannabis sativa and Taxus baccata are restricted for use as per the Official Gazette of the Republic of Slovenia.

Government and politics 

Slovenia is a parliamentary democracy republic with a multi-party system. The head of state is the president, who is elected by popular vote and has an important integrative role. The president is elected for five years and at maximum for two consecutive terms. The president has a representative role and is the commander-in-chief of the Slovenian armed forces.

The executive and administrative authority in Slovenia is held by the Government of Slovenia, headed by the Prime Minister and the council of ministers or cabinet, who are elected by the National Assembly. The legislative authority is held by the bicameral Parliament of Slovenia, characterised by an asymmetric duality. The bulk of power is concentrated in the National Assembly, which consists of ninety members. Of those, 88 are elected by all the citizens in a system of proportional representation, whereas two are elected by the registered members of the autochthonous Hungarian and Italian minorities. Election takes place every four years. The National Council, consisting of forty members, appointed to represent social, economic, professional and local interest groups, has a limited advisory and control power.
The 1992–2004 period was marked by the rule of the Liberal Democracy of Slovenia, which was responsible for gradual transition from the Titoist economy to the capitalist market economy. It later attracted much criticism by neo-liberal economists, who demanded a less gradual approach. The party's president Janez Drnovšek, who served as prime minister between 1992 and 2002, was one of the most influential Slovenian politicians of the 1990s, alongside President Milan Kučan (who served between 1990 and 2002).

The 2005–2008 period was characterized by over-enthusiasm after joining the EU. During the first term of Janez Janša's government, for the first time after independence, the Slovenian banks saw their loan-deposit ratios veering out of control. There was over-borrowing from foreign banks and then over-crediting of customers, including local business magnates.

After the onset of the financial crisis of 2007–2010 and European sovereign-debt crisis, the left-wing coalition that replaced Janša's government in the 2008 elections, had to face the consequences of the 2005–2008 over-borrowing. Attempts to implement reforms that would help economic recovery were met by student protesters, led by a student who later became a member of Janez Janša's SDS, and by the trade unions. The proposed reforms were postponed in a referendum. The left-wing government was ousted with a vote of no confidence. Janez Janša attributed the boom of spending and overborrowing to the period of left-wing government; he proposed harsh austerity reforms which he had previously helped postpone. Generally, some economists estimate that both left and right parties contributed to over-loaning and managers' takeovers; the reason behind this was that each bloc tried to establish an economic elite which would support its political forces.

In March 2020, Janez Janša became prime minister for third time in the new coalition government of SDS, the Modern Centre Party (SMC), New Slovenia (NSi) and Pensioners' Party (DeSUS). Janša had previously been prime minister from 2004 to 2008 and from 2012 to 2013.
Janez Janša was known as a right-wing populist and an outspoken supporter of former US President Donald Trump. Janša was also known  as an ally of right-wing Prime Minister Viktor Orban of Hungary. In April 2022, liberal opposition, The Freedom Movement, won the parliamentary election. The Freedom Movement won 34.5% of the vote, compared with 23.6% for Janša’s Slovenian Democratic party. On 25 May 2022, Slovenia’s parliament voted to appoint the leader of Freedom Movement, Robert Golob, as the new Prime Minister of Slovenia to succeed  Janez Janša.

Judiciary 

Judicial powers in Slovenia are executed by judges, who are elected by the National Assembly. Judicial power in Slovenia is implemented by courts with general responsibilities and specialised courts that deal with matters relating to specific legal areas. The State Prosecutor is an independent state authority responsible for prosecuting cases brought against those suspected of committing criminal offences. The Constitutional Court, composed of nine judges elected for nine-year terms, decides on the conformity of laws with the Constitution; all laws and regulations must also conform with the general principles of international law and with ratified international agreements.

Military 

The Slovenian Armed Forces provide military defence independently or within an alliance, in accordance with international agreements. Since conscription was abolished in 2003, it is organized as a fully professional standing army. The Commander-in-Chief is the President of the Republic of Slovenia, while operational command is in the domain of the Chief of the General Staff of the Slovenian Armed Forces. In 2016, military spending was an estimated 0.91% of the country's GDP. Since joining NATO, the Slovenian Armed Forces have taken a more active part in supporting international peace. They have participated in peace support operations and humanitarian activities. Among others, Slovenian soldiers are a part of international forces serving in Bosnia and Herzegovina, Kosovo, and Afghanistan.

Administrative divisions and traditional regions

Municipalities 
Officially, Slovenia is subdivided into 212 municipalities (twelve of which have the status of urban municipalities). The municipalities are the only bodies of local autonomy in Slovenia. Each municipality is headed by a mayor (župan), elected every four years by popular vote, and a municipal council (občinski svet). In the majority of municipalities, the municipal council is elected through the system of proportional representation; only a few smaller municipalities use the plurality voting system. In the urban municipalities, the municipal councils are called town (or city) councils. Every municipality also has a Head of the Municipal Administration (načelnik občinske uprave), appointed by the mayor, who is responsible for the functioning of the local administration.

Administrative districts 
There is no official intermediate unit between the municipalities and the Republic of Slovenia. The 62 administrative districts, officially called "Administrative Units" (upravne enote), are only subdivisions of the national government administration and are named after their respective bases of government offices. They are headed by a Manager of the Unit (načelnik upravne enote), appointed by the Minister of Public Administration.

Traditional regions and identities 
Traditional regions were based on the former Habsburg crown lands that included Carniola, Carinthia, Styria, and the Littoral. Stronger than with either the Carniola as a whole, or with Slovenia as the state, Slovenes historically tend to identify themselves with the traditional regions of Slovene Littoral, Prekmurje, and even traditional (sub)regions, such as Upper, Lower and, to a lesser extent, Inner Carniola.

The capital city Ljubljana was historically the administrative centre of Carniola and belonged to Inner Carniola, except for the Šentvid district, which was in Upper Carniola and also where the border between German-annexed territory and the Italian Province of Ljubljana was during the Second World War.

Statistical regions 
The 12 statistical regions have no administrative function and are subdivided into two macroregions for the purpose of the Regional policy of the European Union.
These two macroregions are:
Eastern Slovenia (Vzhodna Slovenija – SI01), which groups the Mura, Drava, Carinthia, Savinja, Central Sava, Lower Sava, Southeast Slovenia, and Inner Carniola–Karst statistical regions.
Western Slovenia (Zahodna Slovenija – SI02), which groups the Central Slovenia, Upper Carniola, Gorizia, and Coastal–Karst statistical regions.

International interventions 
In 2022 Slovenia joined a list of nations banning Russian aircraft from its airspace as a sanction against it for invading Ukraine.

Economy 

Slovenia has a developed economy and is the richest Slavic country by GDP per capita. Slovenia is also among the top global economies in terms of human capital. It is the most developed transition country with an old mining-industrial tradition, chemical industry, and developed service activities.
Slovenia was in the beginning of 2007 the first new member to introduce the euro as its currency, replacing the tolar. Since 2010, it has been member of the Organisation for Economic Co-operation and Development. There is a big difference in prosperity between the various regions. The economically wealthiest regions are the Central Slovenia region, which includes the capital Ljubljana and the western Slovenian regions (the Gorizia and Coastal–Karst Statistical Regions), while the least wealthy regions are the Mura, Central Sava, and Littoral–Inner Carniola Statistical Regions.

Economic growth 

In 2004–06, the economy grew on average by nearly 5% a year in Slovenia; in 2007, it expanded by almost 7%. The growth surge was fuelled by debt, particularly among firms, and especially in construction. The financial crisis of 2007–2010 and European sovereign-debt crisis had a significant impact on the domestic economy. The construction industry was severely hit in 2010 and 2011.

In 2009, Slovenian GDP per capita shrank by 8%, the biggest decline in the European Union after the Baltic countries and Finland. An increasing burden for the Slovenian economy has been its rapidly aging population.

In August 2012, the year-on-year contraction was 0.8%; however, 0.2% growth was recorded in the first quarter (in relation to the quarter before, after data was adjusted according to season and working days). Year-on-year contraction has been attributed to the fall in domestic consumption and the slowdown in export growth. The decrease in domestic consumption has been attributed to the fiscal austerity, to the freeze on budget expenditure in the final months of 2011, to the failure of the efforts to implement economic reforms, to inappropriate financing, and to the decrease in exports.

Due to the effects of the crisis, it was expected that several banks had to be bailed out by EU funds in 2013; however, needed capital was able to be covered by the country's own funds. Fiscal actions and legislations aiming on the reduction of spendings as well as several privatisations supported an economic recovery as from 2014. The real economic growth rate was at 2.5% in 2016 and accelerated to 5% in 2017. The construction sector has seen a recent increase, and the tourism industry is expected to have continuous rising numbers.

National debt 
Slovenia's total national debt rose substantially during the Great Recession and was decreasing ; at the end of 2018 amounted to 32,223 million euros, 70% of the GDP.

Services and industry 
Almost two-thirds of people are employed in services, and over one-third in industry and construction. Slovenia benefits from a well-educated workforce, well-developed infrastructure, and its location at the crossroads of major trade routes.

The level of foreign direct investment (FDI) per capita in Slovenia is one of the lowest in the EU, and the labor productivity and the competitiveness of the Slovenian economy is still significantly below the EU average. Taxes are relatively high, the labor market is seen by business interests as being inflexible, and industries are losing sales to China, India, and elsewhere.

High level of openness makes Slovenia extremely sensitive to economic conditions in its main trading partners and changes in its international price competitiveness. The main industries are motor vehicles, electric and electronic equipment, machinery, pharmaceuticals, and fuels. Examples of major Slovenian companies operating in Slovenia include the home appliance manufacturer Gorenje, the pharmaceutical companies Krka and Lek (Novartis' subsidiary), the oil distributing company Petrol Group, energy distribution companys GEN, GEN-I, HSE and Revoz, a manufacturing subsidiary of Renault.

Energy 

 

In 2018, the net energy production was 12,262 GWh and consumption was 14,501 GWh. Hydroelectric plants produced 4,421 GWh, thermal plants produced 4,049 GWh, and the Krško Nuclear Power Plant produced 2,742 GWh (50% share that goes to Slovenia; other 50% goes to Croatia due to joint ownership). 
Domestic electricity consumption was covered 84.6% by domestic production; percentage is decreasing from year to year meaning Slovenia is more and more depending on electricity import.

A new 600 MW block of Šoštanj thermal power plant finished construction and went online in the autumn of 2014. The new 39.5 MW HE Krško hydro power plant was finished in 2013. The 41.5 MW HE Brežice and 30.5 MW HE Mokrice hydro power plants were built on the Sava River in 2018 and the construction of ten more hydropower plants with a cumulative capacity of 338 MW is planned to be finished by 2030. A large pumped-storage hydro power plant Kozjak on the Drava River is in the planning stage.

At the end of 2018, at least 295 MWp of photovoltaic modules and 31,4 MW of biogas powerplants were installed. Compared to 2017, renewable energy sources contributed 5,6 percentage points more into whole energy consumption. There is interest to add more production in the area of solar and wind energy sources (subsidising schemes are increasing economic feasibility), but microlocation settlement procedures take enormous toll on the efficiency of this intitiatve (nature preservation vs. energy production facilities dilemma).

Tourism 

Slovenia offers tourists a wide variety of natural and cultural amenities. Different forms of tourism have developed. The tourist gravitational area is considerably large, however the tourist market is small. There has been no large-scale tourism and no acute environmental pressures; in 2017, National Geographic Traveller's Magazine declared Slovenia as the country with the world's most sustainable tourism.The nation's capital, Ljubljana, has many important Baroque and Vienna Secession buildings, with several important works of the native born architect Jože Plečnik and also his pupil, architect Edo Ravnikar.

At the northwestern corner of the country lie the Julian Alps with Lake Bled and the Soča Valley, as well as the nation's highest peak, Mount Triglav in the middle of Triglav National Park. Other mountain ranges include Kamnik–Savinja Alps, the Karawanks, and Pohorje, popular with skiers and hikers.

The Karst Plateau in the Slovene Littoral gave its name to karst, a landscape shaped by water dissolving the carbonate bedrock, forming caves. The best-known caves are Postojna Cave and the UNESCO-listed Škocjan Caves. The region of Slovenian Istria meets the Adriatic Sea, where the most important historical monument is the Venetian Gothic Mediterranean town of Piran while the settlement of Portorož attracts crowds in summer.

The hills around Slovenia's second-largest town, Maribor, are renowned for their wine-making. The northeastern part of the country is rich with spas, with Rogaška Slatina, Radenci, Čatež ob Savi, Dobrna, and Moravske Toplice growing in importance in the last two decades.

Other popular tourist destinations include the historic cities of Ptuj and Škofja Loka, and several castles, such as Predjama Castle.

Important parts of tourism in Slovenia include congress and gambling tourism. Slovenia is the country with the highest percentage of casinos per 1,000 inhabitants in the European Union. Perla in Nova Gorica is the largest casino in the region.

Most of foreign tourists to Slovenia come from the key European markets: Italy, Austria, Germany, Croatia, Benelux, Serbia, Russia and Ukraine, followed by UK and Ireland. European tourists create more than 90% of Slovenia's tourist income. In 2016, Slovenia was declared the world's first green country by the Netherlands-based organization Green Destinations. On being declared the most sustainable country in 2016, Slovenia had a big part to play at the ITB Berlin to promote sustainable tourism.

Transport 

Since Antiquity, geography has dictated transport routes in Slovenia. Significant mountain ranges, major rivers and proximity to the Danube played roles in the development of the area's transportation corridors. One recent particular advantage are the Pan-European transport corridors V (the fastest link between the North Adriatic, and Central and Eastern Europe) and X (linking Central Europe with the Balkans). This gives it a special position in the European social, economic and cultural integration and restructuring.

Roads 
The road freight and passenger transport constitutes the largest part of transport in Slovenia at 80%. Personal cars are much more popular than public road passenger transport, which has significantly declined. Slovenia has a very high highway and motorway density compared to the European Union average. The highway system, the construction of which was accelerated after 1994, has slowly but steadily transformed Slovenia into a large conurbation. Other state roads have been rapidly deteriorating because of neglect and the overall increase in traffic.

Railways 

The existing Slovenian railways are out-of-date and have difficulty competing with the motorway network; partially also as a result of dispersed population settlement. Due to this fact and the projected increase in traffic through the port of Koper, which is primarily by train, a second rail on the Koper-Divača route is in early stages of starting construction. With a lack of financial assets, maintenance and modernisation of the Slovenian railway network have been neglected. Due to the out-of-date infrastructure, the share of the railway freight transport has been in decline in Slovenia. The railway passenger transport has been recovering after a large drop in the 1990s. The Pan-European railway corridors V and X, and several other major European rail lines intersect in Slovenia.

Ports 
The major Slovenian port is the Port of Koper. It is the largest Northern Adriatic port in terms of container transport, with almost 590,000 TEUs annually and lines to all major world ports. It is much closer to destinations east of the Suez than the ports of Northern Europe. In addition, the maritime passenger traffic mostly takes place in Koper. Two smaller ports used for the international passenger transport as well as cargo transport are located in Izola and Piran. Passenger transport mainly takes place with Italy and Croatia. Splošna plovba, the only Slovenian shipping company, transports freight and is active only in foreign ports.

Air 
Air transport in Slovenia is quite low, but has significantly grown since 1991. Of the three international airports in Slovenia, Ljubljana Jože Pučnik Airport in central Slovenia is the busiest, with connections to many major European destinations. The Maribor Edvard Rusjan Airport is located in the eastern part of the country and the Portorož Airport in the western part. The state-owned Adria Airways is the largest Slovenian airline; however in 2019 it declared bankruptcy and ceased operations. Since 2003, several new carriers have entered the market, mainly low-cost airlines. The only Slovenian military airport is the Cerklje ob Krki Air Base in the southwestern part of the country. There are also 12 public airports in Slovenia.

Demographics 

With 101 inhabitants per square kilometer (262/sq mi), Slovenia ranks low among the European countries in population density (compared to 402/km2 (1042/sq mi) for the Netherlands or 195/km2 (505/sq mi) for Italy). The Inner Carniola–Karst Statistical Region has the lowest population density while the Central Slovenia Statistical Region has the highest.

Slovenia is among the European countries with the most pronounced ageing of its population, ascribable to a low birth rate and increasing life expectancy. Almost all Slovenian inhabitants older than 64 are retired, with no significant difference between the genders. The working-age group is diminishing in spite of immigration. The proposal to raise the retirement age from the current 57 for women and 58 for men was rejected in a referendum in 2011. In addition, the difference among the genders regarding life expectancy is still significant. The total fertility rate (TFR) in 2014 was estimated at 1.33 children born/woman, which is lower than the replacement rate of 2.1. The majority of children are born to unmarried women (in 2016, 58.6% of all births were outside of marriage).
In 2018, life expectancy at birth was 81.1 years (78.2 years male, and 84 years female).

In 2009, the suicide rate in Slovenia was 22 per 100,000 persons per year, which places Slovenia among the highest ranked European countries in this regard. Nonetheless, from 2000 until 2010, the rate has decreased by about 30%. The differences between regions and the genders are pronounced.

Urbanisation 

Depending on definition, between 65% and 79% of people live in wider urban areas. According to OECD definition of rural areas none of the Slovene statistical regions is mostly urbanised, meaning that 15% or less of the population lives in rural communities. According to this definition statistical regions are classified:
 mostly rural regions: Mura, Drava, Carinthia, Savinja, Lower Sava, Littoral–Inner Carniola, Gorizia, Southeast Slovenia
 moderately rural regions: Central Sava, Upper Carniola, Coastal–Karst, Central Slovenia.

The only large town is the capital, Ljubljana. Other (medium-sized) towns include Maribor, Celje, and Kranj. Overall, there are eleven urban municipalities in Slovenia.

Municipalities by population 

212 municipalities in total. Hodoš, the smallest, has 354 inhabitants.

Municipalities by area 

Odranci, the smallest, measures 6.9 km2.

Languages 

The official language in Slovenia is Slovene, which is a member of the South Slavic language group. In 2002, Slovene was the native language of around 88% of Slovenia's population according to the census, with more than 92% of the Slovenian population speaking it in their home environment. This statistic ranks Slovenia among the most homogeneous countries in the EU in terms of the share of speakers of the predominant mother tongue.

Slovene is a highly diverse Slavic language in terms of dialects, with different degrees of mutual intelligibility. Accounts of the number of dialects range from as few as seven dialects, often considered dialect groups or dialect bases that are further subdivided into as many as 50 dialects. Other sources characterize the number of dialects as nine or as eight.

Hungarian and Italian, spoken by the respective minorities, enjoy the status of official languages in the ethnically mixed regions along the Hungarian and Italian borders, to the extent that even the passports issued in those areas are bilingual. In 2002 around 0.2% of the Slovenian population spoke Italian and around 0.4% spoke Hungarian as their native language. Hungarian is co-official with Slovene in 30 settlements in 5 municipalities (whereof 3 are officially bilingual). Italian is co-official with Slovene in 25 settlements in 4 municipalities (all of them officially bilingual).

Romani, spoken in 2002 as the native language by 0.2% of people, is a legally protected language in Slovenia. Romani-speakers mainly belong to the geographically dispersed and marginalized Roma community.

German, which used to be the largest minority language in Slovenia prior to World War II (around 4% of the population in 1921), is now the native language of only around 0.08% of the population, the majority of whom are more than 60 years old. Gottscheerish or Granish, the traditional German dialect of Gottschee County, faces extinction.

A significant number of people in Slovenia speak a variant of Serbo-Croatian (Serbian, Croatian, Bosnian, or Montenegrin) as their native language. These are mostly immigrants who moved to Slovenia from other former Yugoslav republics from the 1960s to the late 1980s, and their descendants. Altogether, Serbo-Croatian in its different forms is the second natively spoken language in Slovenia with 5,9% of population. In 2002, 0.4% of the Slovenian population declared themselves to be native speakers of Albanian and 0.2% native speakers of Macedonian. Czech, the fourth-largest minority language in Slovenia prior to World War II (after German, Hungarian, and Serbo-Croatian), is now the native language of a few hundred residents of Slovenia.

Regarding the knowledge of foreign languages, Slovenia ranks among the top European countries. The most taught foreign languages are English, German, Italian, French and Spanish. , 92% of the population between the age of 25 and 64 spoke at least one foreign language and around 71.8% of them spoke at least two foreign languages, which was the highest percentage in the European Union. According to the Eurobarometer survey,  the majority of Slovenes could speak Croatian (61%) and English (56%). A reported 42% of Slovenes could speak German, which was one of the highest percentages outside German-speaking countries. Italian is widely spoken on the Slovenian Coast and in some other areas of the Slovene Littoral. Around 15% of Slovenians can speak Italian, which is (according to the Eurobarometer pool) the third-highest percentage in the European Union, after Italy and Malta.

Immigration 
In 2015, about 12% (237,616 people) of the population in Slovenia was born abroad. About 86% of the foreign-born population originated from other countries of former Yugoslavia as (in descending order) Bosnia-Herzegovina, followed by immigrants from Croatia, Serbia, North Macedonia, and Kosovo.

By the beginning of 2017, there were about 114,438 people with foreign citizenship residing in the country making up 5.5% of the total population. Of these foreigners, 76% had citizenships of the other countries from former Yugoslavia (excluding Croatia). Additionally 16.4% had EU-citizenships and 7.6% had citizenships of other countries.

According to the 2002 census, Slovenia's main ethnic group are Slovenes (83%); however, their share in the total population is continuously decreasing, due to their relatively low fertility rate. At least 13% (2002) of the population were immigrants from other parts of Former Yugoslavia and their descendants. They have settled mainly in cities and suburbanised areas. Relatively small but protected by the Constitution of Slovenia are the Hungarian and the Italian ethnic minority. A special position is held by the autochthonous and geographically dispersed Roma ethnic community.

The number of people immigrating into Slovenia rose steadily from 1995 and has been increasing even more rapidly in recent years. After Slovenia joined the EU in 2004, the annual number of immigrants doubled by 2006 and increased by half yet again by 2009. In 2007, Slovenia had one of the fastest growing net migration rates in the European Union.

Emigration 
Between 1880 and 1918 (the period covering World War I), many men left Slovenia to work in mining areas in other nations. The United States in particular has been a common choice for emigration, with the 1910 US Census showing that there were already "183,431 persons in the USA of Slovenian mother tongue". However, there may have been many more, because a good number avoided anti-Slavic prejudice and "identified themselves as Austrians." Favorite localities before 1900 were Minnesota, Wisconsin, Michigan, as well as Omaha, Nebraska, Joliet, Illinois, Cleveland, Ohio, and rural areas of Iowa. After 1910, they settled in Utah (Bingham Copper Mine), Colorado (especially Pueblo), and Butte, Montana. These areas attracted many single men (who often boarded with Slovenian families). After locating work and having sufficient money, the men sent back for their wives and families to join them.

Religion

Before World War II, 97% of the population declared itself Catholic (Roman Rite), around 2.5% as Lutheran, and around 0.5% of residents identified themselves as members of other denominations. After 1945, the country underwent a process of gradual but steady secularization. After a decade of persecution of religions, the Communist regime adopted a policy of relative tolerance towards churches. After 1990, the Catholic Church regained some of its former influence, but Slovenia remains a largely secularized society. According to the 2002 census, 57.8% of the population is Catholic. In 1991, 71.6% were self-declared Catholics which means a drop of more than 1% annually. The vast majority of Slovenian Catholics belong to the Latin Rite. A small number of Greek Catholics live in the White Carniola region.

The 2018 Eurobarometer data shows 73.4% of population identifying as Catholic that fell to 72.1% in the 2019 Eurobarometer survey. According to the Catholic Church data, the Catholic population fell from 78.04% in 2009 to 72.11% in 2019

Despite a relatively small number of Protestants (less than 1% in 2002), the Protestant legacy is historically significant given that the Slovene standard language and Slovene literature were established by the Protestant Reformation in the 16th century. Primoz Trubar, a theologian in the Lutheran tradition, was one of the most influential Protestant Reformers in Slovenia. Protestantism was extinguished in the Counter-Reformation implemented by the Habsburg dynasty, which controlled the region. It only survived in the easternmost regions due to protection of Hungarian nobles, who often happened to be Calvinist themselves. Today, a significant Lutheran minority lives in the easternmost region of Prekmurje, where they represent around a fifth of the population and are headed by a bishop with the seat in Murska Sobota.

The third largest denomination, with around 2.2% of the population, is the Eastern Orthodox Church, with most adherents belonging to the Serbian Orthodox Church while a minority belongs to the Macedonian and other Eastern Orthodox churches.

According to the 2002 census, Islam is the second largest religious denomination in the country, with around 2.4% of the population. Most Slovenian Muslims came from Bosnia.

Slovenia has long been home to a Jewish community. Despite the losses suffered during the Holocaust, Judaism still numbers a few hundred adherents, mostly living in Ljubljana, site of the sole remaining active synagogue in the country.

In the 2002, around 10% of Slovenes declared themselves as atheists, another 10% professed no specific denomination, and around 16% decided not to answer the question about their religious affiliation. According to the Eurobarometer Poll 2010, 32% of Slovenian citizens responded that "they believe there is a god", whereas 36% answered that "they believe there is some sort of spirit or life force" and 26% that "they do not believe there is any sort of spirit, god, or life force".

Education 

Slovenia's education ranks as the 12th best in the world and 4th best in the European Union, being significantly higher than the OECD average, according to the Programme for International Student Assessment. Among people age 25 to 64, 12% have attended higher education, while on average Slovenes have 9.6 years of formal education. According to an OECD report, 83% of adults ages 25–64 have earned the equivalent of a high school degree, well above the OECD average of 74%; among 25- to 34-year-olds, the rate is 93%. According to the 1991 census there is 99.6% literacy in Slovenia. Lifelong learning is also increasing.

Primary
Responsibility for education oversight at primary and secondary level in Slovenia lies with the Ministry of Education and Sports. After non-compulsory pre-school education, children enter the nine-year primary school at the age of six. Primary school is divided into three periods, each of three years. In the academic year 2006–2007 there were 166,000 pupils enrolled in elementary education and more than 13,225 teachers, giving a ratio of one teacher per 12 pupils and 20 pupils per class.

Secondary
After completing elementary school, nearly all children (more than 98%) go on to secondary education, either vocational, technical or general secondary programmes (gimnazija). The latter concludes with matura, the final exam that allows the graduates to enter a university. 84% of secondary school graduates go on to tertiary education.

Tertiary
Among several universities in Slovenia, the best ranked is the University of Ljubljana, ranking among the first 500 or the first 3% of the world's best universities according to the ARWU. Two other public universities include the University of Maribor in Styria region and the University of Primorska in Slovene Littoral. In addition, there is a private University of Nova Gorica and an international EMUNI University.

Culture

Heritage 
Slovenia's architectural heritage includes 2,500 churches, 1,000 castles, ruins, and manor houses, farmhouses, and special structures for drying hay, called hayracks.

Four natural and cultural sites in Slovenia are on the UNESCO World Heritage Site list. Škocjan Caves and its karst landscape are a protected site as the old forests in the area of Goteniški Snežnik and Kočevski Rog in the SE Slovenia. The Idrija Mercury mining site is of world importance, as are the prehistoric pile dwellings in the Ljubljana Marsh. 

The most picturesque church for photographers is the medieval and Baroque building on Bled Island. The castle above the lake is a museum and restaurant with a view. Near Postojna there is a fortress called Predjama Castle, half hidden in a cave. Museums in Ljubljana and elsewhere feature unique items such as the Divje Babe Flute and the oldest wheel in the world. Ljubljana has medieval, Baroque, Art Nouveau, and modern architecture. The architect Plečnik's architecture and his innovative paths and bridges along the Ljubljanica are notable and on UNESCO tentative list.

Cuisine 

Slovenian cuisine is a mixture of Central European cuisine (especially Austrian and Hungarian), Mediterranean cuisine and Balkan cuisine. Historically, Slovenian cuisine was divided into town, farmhouse, cottage, castle, parsonage and monastic cuisines. Due to the variety of Slovenian cultural and natural landscapes, there are more than 40 distinct regional cuisines.

Ethnologically, the most characteristic Slovene dishes were one-pot dishes, such as ričet, Istrian stew, minestrone, and žganci buckwheat spoonbread; in the Prekmurje region there is also bujta repa, and prekmurska gibanica pastry. Prosciutto is a delicacy of the Slovene Littoral. The nut roll has become a symbol of Slovenia, especially among the Slovene diaspora in the United States. Soups were added to the traditional one-pot meals and various kinds of porridge and stew only in relatively recent history.

Each year since 2000, the Roasted Potato Festival has been organized by the Society for the Recognition of Roasted Potatoes as a Distinct Dish, attracting thousands of visitors. Roasted potatoes, which have been traditionally served in most Slovenian families only on Sundays—preceded by a meat-based soup, such as beef or chicken soup—have been depicted on a special edition of post marks by the Post of Slovenia on 23 November 2012. The best known sausage is kranjska klobasa. Slovenia is also the home of the world's oldest vine, which is 400 years old.

Slovenia has been awarded the European Region of Gastronomy title for the year 2021.

Dance 
Historically the most notable Slovenian ballet dancers and choreographers were Pino Mlakar (1907‒2006), who in 1927 graduated from the Rudolf Laban Choreographic Institute, and there met his future wife, balerina Maria Luiza Pia Beatrice Scholz (1908‒2000). Together they worked as a leading dancer and a choreographer in Dessau (1930–1932), Zürich (1934–1938), and State opera in München (1939‒1944). Their plan to build a Slovenian dance centre at Rožnik Hill after the World War II was supported by the minister of culture, Ferdo Kozak, but was cancelled by his successor. Pino Mlakar was also a full professor at the Academy for Theatre, Radio, Film and Television (AGRFT) of the University of Ljubljana. Between 1952 in 1954 they again led State opera ballet in Munich. A Mary Wigman modern dance school was founded in the 1930s by her student, Meta Vidmar, in Ljubljana.

Festivals, book fairs, and other events 
A number of music, theater, film, book, and children's festivals take place in Slovenia each year, including the music festivals Ljubljana Summer Festival and Lent Festival, the stand-up comedy Punch Festival, the children's Pippi Longstocking Festival, and the book festivals Slovene book fair and Frankfurt after the Frankfurt.

The most notable music festival of Slovene music was historically the Slovenska popevka festival. Between 1981 and 2000 the Novi Rock festival was notable for bringing rock music across Iron curtain from the West to the Slovenian and then Yugoslav audience. The long tradition of jazz festivals in Titoist Yugoslavia began with the Ljubljana Jazz Festival which has been held annually in Slovenia since 1960.

Film 
Slovene film actors and actresses historically include Ida Kravanja, who played her roles as Ita Rina in the early European films, and Metka Bučar. After the WW II, one of the most notable film actors was Polde Bibič, who played a number of roles in many films that were well received in Slovenia, including Don't Cry, Peter (1964), On Wings of Paper (1968), Kekec's Tricks (1968), Flowers in Autumn (1973), The Widowhood of Karolina Žašler (1976), Heritage (1986), Primož Trubar (1985), and My Dad, The Socialist Kulak (1987). Many of these were directed by Matjaž Klopčič. He also performed in television and radio drama. Altogether, Bibič played over 150 theatre and over 30 film roles.

Feature film and short film production in Slovenia historically includes Karol Grossmann, František Čap, France Štiglic, Igor Pretnar, Jože Pogačnik, Peter Zobec, Matjaž Klopčič, Boštjan Hladnik, Dušan Jovanović, Vitan Mal, Franci Slak, and Karpo Godina as its most established filmmakers. Contemporary film directors Filip Robar - Dorin, Jan Cvitkovič, Damjan Kozole, Janez Lapajne, Mitja Okorn, and Marko Naberšnik are among the representatives of the so-called "Renaissance of Slovenian cinema". Slovene screenwriters, who are not film directors, include Saša Vuga and Miha Mazzini. Women film directors include Polona Sepe, Hanna A. W. Slak, and Maja Weiss.

Literature

Authors
Today, notable authors include Slavoj Žižek, Mladen Dolar, Alenka Zupančič as well as Boris Pahor, a German Nazi concentration camp survivor, who opposed Italian Fascism and Titoist Communism.

Literary history

History of Slovene literature began in the 16th century with Primož Trubar and other Protestant Reformers. Poetry in Slovene achieved its highest level with the Romantic poet France Prešeren (1800–1849). In the 20th century, the Slovene literary fiction went through several periods: the beginning of the century was marked by the authors of the Slovene Modernism, with the most influential Slovene writer and playwright, Ivan Cankar; it was then followed by expressionism (Srečko Kosovel), avantgardism (Anton Podbevšek, Ferdo Delak) and social realism (Ciril Kosmač, Prežihov Voranc) before World War II, the poetry of resistance and revolution (Karel Destovnik Kajuh, Matej Bor) during the war, and intimism (Poems of the Four, 1953), post-war modernism (Edvard Kocbek), and existentialism (Dane Zajc) after the war.

Postmodernist authors include Boris A. Novak, Marko Kravos, Drago Jančar, Evald Flisar, Tomaž Šalamun, and Brina Svit. Among the post-1990 authors best known are Aleš Debeljak, Miha Mazzini, and Alojz Ihan. There are several literary magazines that publish Slovene prose, poetry, essays, and local literary criticism.

Music 

The Slovenian Philharmonics, established in 1701 as part of Academia operosorum Labacensis, is among the oldest such institutions in Europe. Music of Slovenia historically includes numerous musicians and composers, such as the Renaissance composer Jacobus Gallus (1550–1591), who greatly influenced Central European classical music, the Baroque composer Joannes Baptista Dolar (ca. 1620–1673), and the violin virtuoso Giuseppe Tartini.

During the medieval era, secular music was as popular as church music, including wandering minnesingers. By the time of Protestant Reformation in the 16th century, music was used to proselytize. The first Slovenian hymnal, Eni Psalmi, was published in 1567. This period saw the rise of musicians like Jacobus Gallus and Jurij Slatkonja.

In 1701, Johann Berthold von Höffer (1667–1718), a nobleman and amateur composer from Ljubljana, founded the Academia Philharmonicorum Labacensis, as one of the oldest such institutions in Europe, based on Italian models.

Composers of Slovenian Lieder and art songs include Emil Adamič (1877–1936), Fran Gerbič (1840–1917), Alojz Geržinič (1915–2008), Benjamin Ipavec (1829–1908), Davorin Jenko (1835–1914), Anton Lajovic (1878–1960), Kamilo Mašek (1831–1859), Josip Pavčič (1870–1949), Zorko Prelovec (1887–1939), and Lucijan Marija Škerjanc (1900–1973).

In the early 20th century, impressionism was spreading across Slovenia, which soon produced composers Marij Kogoj and Slavko Osterc. Avant-garde classical music arose in Slovenia in the 1960s, largely due to the work of Uroš Krek, Dane Škerl, Primož Ramovš and Ivo Petrić, who also conducted the Slavko Osterc Ensemble. Jakob Jež, Darijan Božič, Lojze Lebič and Vinko Globokar have since composed enduring works, especially Globokar's L'Armonia, an opera.

Modern composers include Uroš Rojko, Tomaž Svete, Brina Jež-Brezavšček, Božidar Kantušer and Aldo Kumar. Kumar's Sonata z igro 12 (A sonata with a play 12), a set of variations on a rising chromatic scale, is particularly notable.

The Slovene National Opera and Ballet Theatre serves as the national opera and ballet house.

Traditional folk music
Harmony singing is a deep rooted tradition in Slovenia, and is at least three-part singing (four voices), while in some regions even up to eight-part singing (nine voices). Slovenian folk songs, thus, usually resounds soft and harmonious, and are very seldom in minor. Traditional Slovenian folk music is performed on Styrian harmonica (the oldest type of accordion), fiddle, clarinet, zithers, flute, and by brass bands of alpine type. In eastern Slovenia, fiddle and cimbalon bands are called velike goslarije.

Modern folk (Slovenian country) music

From 1952 on, the Slavko Avsenik's band began to appear in broadcasts, movies, and concerts all over the West Germany, inventing the original "Oberkrainer" country sound that has become the primary vehicle of ethnic musical expression not only in Slovenia, but also in Germany, Austria, Switzerland, and in the Benelux, spawning hundreds of Alpine orchestras in the process. The band produced nearly 1000 original compositions, an integral part of the Slovenian-style polka legacy. Many musicians followed Avsenik's steps, including Lojze Slak.

Slovenska popevka
A similarly high standing in Slovene culture, like the Sanremo Music Festival has had in Italian culture, was attributed to the Slovenska popevka, a specific genre of popular Slovene music.

Popular music
Among pop, rock, industrial, and indie musicians the most popular in Slovenia include industrial music group Laibach, as well as Siddharta, a rock band formed in 1995.

Perpetuum Jazzile is the group from Slovenia that is internationally most listened online, with more than 23 million views for the official a cappella "Africa" performance video since its publishing on YouTube in May 2009 (through January 2023) that earned them kudos from the song's co-writer, David Paich. Other Slovenian bands include a historically progressive rock ones that were also popular in Titoist Yugoslavia, such as Buldožer and Lačni Franz, which inspired later comedy rock bands including Zmelkoow, Slon in Sadež and Mi2. With exception of Terrafolk that made appearances worldwide, other bands, such as Avtomobili, Zaklonišče Prepeva, Šank Rock, Big Foot Mama, Dan D, and Zablujena generacija, are mostly unknown outside the country. Slovenian metal bands include Noctiferia (death metal), Negligence (thrash metal), Naio Ssaion (gothic metal), and Within Destruction (deathcore).

Singer-songwriters
Slovenian post-WWII singer-songwriters include Frane Milčinski (1914–1988), Tomaž Pengov whose 1973 album Odpotovanja is considered to be the first singer-songwriter album in former Yugoslavia, Tomaž Domicelj, Marko Brecelj, Andrej Šifrer, Eva Sršen, Neca Falk, and Jani Kovačič. After 1990, Adi Smolar, Iztok Mlakar, Vita Mavrič, Vlado Kreslin, Zoran Predin, Peter Lovšin, and Magnifico have been popular in Slovenia, as well. In the 21st century, there have been many successful artists from Slovenia. They include country musician Manu, Eurovision finalists zalagasper, Nika Zorjan, Omar Naber and Raiven.

Theatre 

In addition to the main houses, which include Slovene National Theatre, Ljubljana and Maribor National Drama Theatre, a number of small producers are active in Slovenia, including physical theatre (e.g. Betontanc), street theatre (e.g. Ana Monró Theatre), theatresports championship Impro League, and improvisational theatre (e.g. IGLU Theatre). A popular form is puppetry, mainly performed in the Ljubljana Puppet Theatre. Theater has a rich tradition in Slovenia, starting with the 1867 first ever Slovene-language drama performance.

Visual arts, architecture and design 

Slovenia's visual arts, architecture, and design are shaped by a number of architects, designers, painters, sculptors, photographers, graphics artists, as well as comics, illustration and conceptual artists. Two significant prestigious institutions exhibiting works of Slovene visual artists are the National Gallery of Slovenia and the Museum of Modern Art.

Architecture 
Modern architecture in Slovenia was introduced by Max Fabiani, and in the mid-war period, Jože Plečnik and Ivan Vurnik. In the second half of the 20th century, the national and universal style were merged by the architects Edvard Ravnikar and first generation of his students: Milan Mihelič, Stanko Kristl, Savin Sever. Next generation is mainly still active Marko Mušič, Vojteh Ravnikar, Jurij Kobe and groups of younger architects.

Selected works of Jože Plečnik which shaped Ljubljana during the inter-war period were inscribed on UNESCO's list of World Heritage Sites in 2021.

Conceptual art 
A number of conceptual visual art groups formed, including OHO, Group 69, and IRWIN. Nowadays, the Slovene visual arts are diverse, based on tradition, reflect the influence of neighboring nations and are intertwined with modern European movements.

Design 
Internationally most notable Slovenian design items include the 1952 Rex chair, a Scandinavian design-inspired wooden chair, by interior designer Niko Kralj that was given in 2012 a permanent place in Designmuseum, Denmark, the largest museum of design in Scandinavia, and is included in the collection of the Museum of Modern Art MOMA in New York City, as well.

An industrial design item that has changed the international ski industry is Elan SCX by Elan company. Even before the Elan SCX, Elan skis were depicted in two films, the 1985 James Bond film series part A View to a Kill with Roger Moore, and Working Girl where Katharine Parker (Sigourney Weaver) was depicted as skiing on the RC ELAN model skis and poles.

Sculpture 

The renewal of Slovene sculpture begun with Alojz Gangl (1859–1935) who created sculptures for the public monuments of the Carniolan polymath Johann Weikhard von Valvasor and Valentin Vodnik, the first Slovene poet and journalist, as well as The Genius of the Theatre and other statues for the Slovenian National Opera and Ballet Theatre building. The development of sculpture after World War II was led by a number of artists, including brothers Boris and Zdenko Kalin, Jakob Savinšek stayed with figural art. Younger sculptors, for example Janez Boljka, Drago Tršar and particularly Slavko Tihec, moved towards abstract forms. Jakov Brdar and Mirsad Begić returned to human figures.

Graphics 
During World War II, numerous graphics were created by Božidar Jakac, who helped establish the post-war Academy of Visual Arts in Ljubljana.

In 1917 Hinko Smrekar illustrated Fran Levstik's book about the well-known Slovene folk hero Martin Krpan. The children's books illustrators include a number of women illustrators, such as Marlenka Stupica, Marija Lucija Stupica, Ančka Gošnik Godec, Marjanca Jemec Božič, and Jelka Reichman.

Painting
Historically, painting and sculpture in Slovenia was in the late 18th and the 19th century marked by Neoclassicism (Matevž Langus), Biedermeier (Giuseppe Tominz) and Romanticism (Michael Stroy). The first art exhibition in Slovenia was organized in the late 19th century by Ivana Kobilca, a woman-painter who worked in realistic tradition. Impressionist artists include Matej Sternen, Matija Jama, Rihard Jakopič, Ivan Grohar whose The Sower (Slovene: Sejalec) was depicted on the €0.05 Slovenian euro coins, and Franc Berneker, who introduced the impressionism to Slovenia. Espressionist painters include Veno Pilon and Tone Kralj whose picture book, reprinted thirteen times, is now the most recognisable image of the folk hero Martin Krpan.
Some of the best known painters in the second half of the 20th century were Zoran Mušič, Gabrijel Stupica and Marij Pregelj.

Photography
In 1841, Janez Puhar (1814–1864) invented a process for photography on glass, recognized on 17 June 1852 in Paris by the Académie Nationale Agricole, Manufacturière et Commerciale. Gojmir Anton Kos was a notable realist painter and photographer between First World War and WW II.

The first photographer from Slovenia whose work was published by National Geographic magazine is Arne Hodalič.

Sports 

Slovenia is a natural sports venue, with many Slovenians actively practicing sports. A variety of sports are played in Slovenia on a professional level, with top international successes in handball, basketball, volleyball, association football, ice hockey, rowing, swimming, tennis, boxing, climbing, road cycling and athletics. Prior to World War II, gymnastics and fencing used to be the most popular sports in Slovenia, with athletes like Leon Štukelj and Miroslav Cerar gaining gold Olympic medals. Association football gained popularity in the interwar period. After 1945, basketball, handball and volleyball have become popular among Slovenians, and from the mid-1970s onward, winter sports have, as well. Since 1992, Slovenian sportspeople have won 52 Olympic medals, including twelve gold medals, and 24 Paralympic medals with four golds.

Individual sports are also very popular in Slovenia, including tennis and mountaineering, which are two of the most widespread sporting activities in Slovenia. Several Slovenian extreme and endurance sportsmen have gained an international reputation, including the mountaineer Tomaž Humar, the mountain skier Davo Karničar, the ultramarathon swimmer Martin Strel and the ultracyclist Jure Robič. Past and current winter sports athletes include alpine skiers, such as Mateja Svet, Bojan Križaj, Ilka Štuhec and double Olympic gold medalist Tina Maze, the cross-country skier Petra Majdič, and ski jumpers, such as Primož Peterka and Peter Prevc. Boxing has gained popularity since Jan Zaveck won the IBF Welterweight World Champion title in 2009.
 
In cycling, Primož Roglič became the first Slovenian to win a Grand Tour when he won the 2019 Vuelta a España. In 2020, Tadej Pogačar won the Tour de France, the world's most competitive cycling race, while Primož Roglič finished second. Pogačar won Tour de France also in 2021,  while finished second in 2022.
Tim Gajser is multiple world champion in  motocross racing.
Prominent team sports in Slovenia include football, basketball, handball, volleyball, and ice hockey. The men's national football team has qualified for one European Championship (2000) and two World Cups (2002 and 2010). Of Slovenian clubs, NK Maribor played three times in the group stages of the UEFA Champions League. The men's national basketball team has participated at 14 EuroBaskets, winning the gold medal in the 2017 edition, and at three FIBA World Championships. Slovenia also hosted the EuroBasket 2013. The men's national handball team has qualified for three Olympics, ten IHF World Championships, including their third-place finish in 2017, and thirteen European Championships. Slovenia was the hosts of the 2004 European Championship, where the national team won the silver medal. Slovenia's most prominent handball team, RK Celje, won the EHF Champions League in the 2003–04 season. In women's handball, RK Krim won the Champions League in 2001 and 2003. The men's national volleyball team has won three silver medals at the European Volleyball Championship (2015, 2019 and 2021), and finished fourth at the 2022 World Championship. The national ice hockey team has played at 28 Ice Hockey World Championships (with 9 appearances in top division), and has participated in the 2014 and 2018 Winter Olympic Games.

See also 

 Outline of Slovenia
 Slovenia (European Parliament constituency)

References

Further reading 

 Perko, Drago, Ciglic, Rok, Zorn, Matija (eds.), The Geography of Slovenia: Small But Diverse (Cham, Springer, 2020).
 Stanić, Stane, Slovenia (London, Flint River Press, 1994).
 Oto Luthar (ed.), The Land Between: A History of Slovenia. With contributions by Oto Luthar, Igor Grdina, Marjeta Šašel Kos, Petra Svoljšak, Peter Kos, Dušan Kos, Peter Štih, Alja Brglez and Martin Pogačar (Frankfurt am Main etc., Peter Lang, 2008).
 The World Book Encyclopedia of People and Places, O–S Oman to Syria (Chicago, World Book, 2011).

External links 

Slovenia from UCB Libraries GovPubs

"Facts About Slovenia", publication from the Slovenian Government Communication Office. pdf. In English, Spanish, French, German and Russian.
Slovenia – Landmarks. Virtual reality panoramas of various spots in the country.
Slovenia: a geographical overview. Association of the Geographical Societies of Slovenia.

Government 
Slovenia.si The main national access point to information about Slovenia.
The Republic of Slovenia. Official institutions.
Statistical Office of the Republic of Slovenia
National Meteorological Service of Slovenia

Travel 
The Slovenian Tourist portal. Slovenian Tourist Board.

 
Central European countries
Balkan countries
Member states of NATO
Member states of the European Union
Member states of the Union for the Mediterranean
Member states of the United Nations
Member states of the Three Seas Initiative
Republics
Southern European countries
States and territories established in 1991
1991 establishments in Europe
Countries in Europe